Chalcosyrphus (Xylotomima) vecors  (Osten Sacken 1875), the Orange-hipped Leafwalker, is an uncommon species of syrphid fly observed throughout North America. Hoverflies can remain nearly motionless in flight. The adults are also known as flower flies, for they are commonly found around and on flowers from which they get both energy-giving nectar and protein-rich pollen.

Distribution
Canada, United States.

References

Eristalinae
Insects described in 1875
Diptera of North America
Hoverflies of North America
Taxa named by Carl Robert Osten-Sacken